The Women's compound overall event at the 2010 South American Games summed the four distances contested over March 20 and 21, and served as the qualifying order for the individual event.

Medalists

Results

References
Report

Overall Compound Women